Harmony School is a private school located in Bloomington, Indiana. The single-building establishment houses every grade from preschool to high school seniors. The parenting Harmony Education Center also includes the National School Reform Faculty, which operates from the basement of the school. 

Harmony focuses on the individual students' learning experiences, and pushes creativity and critical thinking. Each student learns on their own level, and because of how few students are in the school, they can all get individual help from a teacher at any time.

See also
 List of high schools in Indiana
 Sallyann J. Murphey

References

External links
 Official Website

Buildings and structures in Monroe County, Indiana
1974 establishments in Indiana